Visionaries is an underground hip hop crew from Los Angeles, California. The crew formed in 1995, and have since released four full-length albums on Up Above Records, and their fifth album "V" on their newly re-formed label Visionaries Crew, Inc. The crew's six members have collectively released over fifty solo and side projects. They have collaborated and performed with many other artists, including Wu-Tang Clan, Nas, Common, Mos Def, Talib Kweli, Dilated Peoples, De La Soul, Blackalicious, Jean Grae, Psycho Realm, J Dilla, Jurassic 5 and Linkin Park.

Members
 2Mex
 LMNO
 R.ēL.Z.M. a.k.a. "Lord Zen"
 Dannu
 KeyKool
 DJ Rhettmatic

Discography
 Galleries (Up Above Records; 1998)
 Sophomore Jinx (Up Above Records; 2000)
 Pangaea (Up Above Records; 2004)
 We Are the Ones (We've Been Waiting For) (Up Above Records; 2006)
 Est 1995 (Mixtape) (2007)
 V (Visionaries Crew) (2021)

Solo projects
 2Mex (a.k.a. SonGodSuns)
 (As The Mind Clouders) Fake It Until You Make It (1999)
 Words Knot Music (2000)
 B Boys in Occupied Mexico (2001; re-issue 2005)
 Sweat Lodge Infinite (2003)
 Self Titled (2004)
 (As SonGodSuns) Over the Counter Culture (2005)
 My Fanbase Will Destroy You (2010)
 Like Farther ... Like Sun (2013)
 Lospital (2017)
 Gentrification EP (2018)
 LMNO
 Leave My Name Out (2000)
 Collision (2003)
 Economic Food Chain Music (2004)
 This EP Reminds me of '93 (2004)
 P's & Q's (2005)
 Work Ethic (2007)
 Selective Hearing (2008) collaboration with Kev Brown
 Let Em Know (2009)
 Devilish Dandruff with Holy Shampoo (2009)
 Push That Work (2010)
 Fonk Garden (2010)
 Next in Line (2010)
 Selective Hearing Part 2 (2010) collaboration with Kev Brown
 Determined to Fly (2010)
 Banger Management (2010)
 Tripping On This Journey (2010)
 Blessing in Disguise (2010) collaboration with KeyKool & 2Mex
 No Apologies (2010)
 LMNO is Dead (2010)
 Born again (2011) collaboration with kyo Itachi
 It All Adds Up (2012)
 After the Fact (2013)
 Preparanoia (2014)
 10:20 (2020)
 Flying High (2022) collaboration with Madlib, M.E.D., and Declaime as LMD
 Lord Zen and Dannu (known as Writer's Block)
 En Route (2001)
 Next Stop (2005)
 R.ēL.Z.M. a.k.a. "Lord Zen"
 50.5.10 (2006) with band LVX Collective
 Wakefull Dead (2007) collaboration with producer DeeSkee
 Love D'LVX (2008) with band LVX Collective
 Pre-Flight Acknowledgements (2014)
 Key Kool & Rhettmatic
 Kozmonautz (1995)
 DJ Rhettmatic:
 Kozmonautz (with Key Kool) (1995)
 World Famous Beat Junkies Vol 2. - DJ Rhettmatic (with the Beat Junkies) (1999)
 Exclusive Collection (2004)
 "Crown Royale" (with Buff1) (2010)
 Dannu:
 Virgo Summer (2011)

References

External links
 Visionaries Official Site
 Visionaries E-commerce
 Visionaries Bandcamp
 R.ēL.Z.M's Official Site

American hip hop groups
Musical groups from Los Angeles